Alfred Francis Bedford (20 March 1874 – 17 December 1949) was an Australian rules footballer who played a single game for the St Kilda Football Club in the Victorian Football League (VFL).

References

External links 

1874 births
1949 deaths
Australian rules footballers from Victoria (Australia)
St Kilda Football Club players